Petra Štampalija (born August 23, 1980) is a former Croatian female basketball player.

External links
Profile at eurobasket.com

1980 births
Living people
Basketball players from Šibenik
Croatian women's basketball players
Power forwards (basketball)
Centers (basketball)